Land of Silence and Darkness is a 1971 documentary film about deaf-blind people and their experience of life. The film was written, directed, and produced by Werner Herzog. Rolf Illig provided narration.

Herzog follows Fini Straubinger, a German woman who became deaf-blind early in life, as she visits with other deaf-blind people, and discusses their struggle to live in the modern world. In one scene from the film, the filmmakers visit a home for boys who were born deaf-blind; in another, Fini Straubinger and her friends ride in an aeroplane. In the final scene, a man examines a tree with his hands, and embraces it.

See also
 1971 in film
 Deafblindness
 Tactile signing
 List of films featuring the deaf and hard of hearing

References

Further reading

External links 
 

1971 films
1971 documentary films
German documentary films
West German films
1970s German-language films
German Sign Language films
Tactile signing-language films
Documentary films about blind people
Films directed by Werner Herzog
Documentary films about deaf people
1970s German films
Films about disability